Lázaro Jorge Álvarez Estrada (born 28 January 1991) is a Cuban amateur boxer who won the world title in 2011, 2013 and 2015. He also won gold medals at the 2011, 2015, and 2019 Pan American Games and bronze medals at the 2012, 2016 and 2020 Olympics. He is a southpaw.

Career
In the final of 2011 World Championships, he beat Luke Campbell from England after 3 rounds with 14–10 final score.

Later that year he also won the 2011 Pan American title vs Mexican Oscar Valdez.

At the 2012 Summer Olympics, competing at bantamweight, he beat American Joseph Diaz and Robenílson Vieira of Brazil but lost to Irishman John Joe Nevin 14-19 in the semifinal and won bronze.  He lost in the final of the Cuban Championships to Robeisy Ramirez.

After 2012, he moved up to lightweight.

Álvarez won the lightweight title at the 2013 AIBA World Championships, beating Joseph Cordina, Fazliddin Gaibnazarov, Saylom Ardee, Berik Abdrakhmanov and, in the final, Robson Donato Conceicao.

In 2014, he won the Cuban title.

At the 2015 Pan American Games, he won gold, beating Elvis Severino Rodriguez, Kevin Luna and Lindolfo Delgado along the way.  That year, he also won the World Series of Boxing final, against Zakir Safiullin.

He won the bronze medal at the men's lightweight event at the 2016 Summer Olympics, losing to Conceicao in the semifinal.

At the 2019 World Championships, he fought at featherweight, beating Peter McGrail, before losing to Mirazizbek Mirzakhalilov in the final.

References

External links

 (archive)

1991 births
Living people
Bantamweight boxers
Cuban male boxers
Olympic boxers of Cuba
Olympic bronze medalists for Cuba
Olympic medalists in boxing
Boxers at the 2012 Summer Olympics
Boxers at the 2016 Summer Olympics
Medalists at the 2012 Summer Olympics
Medalists at the 2016 Summer Olympics
Pan American Games gold medalists for Cuba
Pan American Games medalists in boxing
Boxers at the 2011 Pan American Games
Boxers at the 2015 Pan American Games
Boxers at the 2019 Pan American Games
Central American and Caribbean Games gold medalists for Cuba
Competitors at the 2014 Central American and Caribbean Games
Competitors at the 2018 Central American and Caribbean Games
AIBA World Boxing Championships medalists
World boxing champions
Featherweight boxers
Central American and Caribbean Games medalists in boxing
Medalists at the 2011 Pan American Games
Medalists at the 2015 Pan American Games
Medalists at the 2019 Pan American Games
Boxers at the 2020 Summer Olympics
Medalists at the 2020 Summer Olympics
People from Pinar del Río
21st-century Cuban people